Daniel Kastner (born 3 November 1981) is an Austrian retired footballer who last played for FC Miesbach in Germany.

Career 
Kastner started his senior career with Braunau. In 2004, he signed for Red Bull Salzburg in the Austrian Football Bundesliga, where he made twenty-two league appearances and scored four goals. After that, he played for SV Ried, SK Schwadorf, SV Grödig, FK Liepāja, Union Mondsee and Miesbach.

References

External links 
 A detour to the Baltic Sea
 "Salzburg will have no problems" 
 Castner: "In Austria," Metallurgist "would probably be in the top six" 
 Daniel Kastner: "Wants to be more successful as a consultant"
 Kastner: From Lithuania to Iceland

Austrian footballers
1981 births
Living people
FC Braunau players
FC Red Bull Salzburg players
SV Ried players
SV Grödig players
Association football forwards